Guðni Valur Guðnason (born 11 October 1995) is an Icelandic discus thrower who was selected to compete at the 2016 Summer Olympics in Rio de Janeiro. He failed to qualify to the finals.

His personal best in the event is 69.35 metres set in Laugardalur in 2020. He is the current Icelandic record holder.

Guðni qualified for the 2020 Summer Olympics in Tokyo, Japan.

International competitions

References

1995 births
Living people
Icelandic male discus throwers
Olympic male discus throwers
Olympic athletes of Iceland
Athletes (track and field) at the 2016 Summer Olympics
World Athletics Championships athletes for Iceland
Icelandic Athletics Championships winners
Athletes (track and field) at the 2020 Summer Olympics